Wachowski (feminine: Wachowska, plural: Wachowscy) is a Polish surname originating from the village of Wachów, Poland. Notable people with the surname include:

 Lilly and Lana Wachowski (born 1967 and 1965), American film directors, writers and producers
 Mieczysław Wachowski (born 1950), Polish politician

See also 
 Warszawski

References 

Polish-language surnames
Polish toponymic surnames